Ryan Dam is a hydroelectric dam on the Missouri River,  downstream from the city of Great Falls in the U.S. state of Montana. It is a run-of-river dam. The dam is built on the largest of the five Great Falls of the Missouri, the "Big Falls", also sometimes called "Great Falls".

The dam, built in 1915 just upstream of the falls and a small island named Ryan Island, is divided into two parts. On the right side of the dam is a concrete-arch spillway structure, that when functioning, releases water over the remains of the waterfall. The center part of the dam consists of a dike that extends from the falls' base to Ryan Island (separating the tailrace from the main river, which it meets a few hundred yards downstream). It also contains a concrete gravity structure facing towards the right bank of the river and tilted to face slightly downstream. This segment of the dam contains the outlet works, a water jet that bursts out and cascades over the waterfall. The left side of the dam is a large powerhouse topped by a concrete gravity structure.

Montana Power Company originally built the dam, PPL Corporation purchased it in 1997 and sold it to NorthWestern Corporation in 2014. Since the dam's construction in the Missouri River gorge, it has flooded a fair portion of the Great Falls - the cascades between Grand Fall and Crooked Falls, which lies several miles upstream - and reduced the flow over Great Falls to such an extent that much of the bedrock is visible. The dam was constructed on top of a  cascade that Lewis and Clark observed to lie just upstream of Grand Fall. The next dam upstream is Cochrane Dam, then Rainbow Dam, and  Black Eagle Dam. The next dam downstream is Morony Dam.

References

External links
Ryan Dam at pplmontana.com
Historic American Engineering Record (HAER) documentation, filed under Missouri River, Northeast of Great Falls, Cascade County, MT:

Arch-gravity dams
Buildings and structures in Cascade County, Montana
Dams completed in 1915
Dams in Montana
Dams on the Missouri River
Energy infrastructure completed in 1915
Historic American Engineering Record in Montana
NorthWestern Corporation dams
Run-of-the-river power stations
1915 establishments in Montana